The National League, known as the Vanarama National League for sponsorship reasons, is the highest level of the National League System and fifth-highest of the overall English football league system. It is the highest league that is semi-professional in the English football league system (although as of the 2022–23 season, all but 3 clubs are fully professional). Notable former English Football League clubs that compete in the National League include: Scunthorpe United, Chesterfield, Oldham Athletic, Notts County, Wrexham and Torquay United. The National League is the lowest division in the English football pyramid organised on a nationwide basis. Formerly the Conference National, the league was renamed the National League from the 2015–16 season.

The longest tenured team currently competing in the National League is Wrexham. As of the 2022–23 season, there is one former Premier League club competing in the National League: Oldham Athletic.

History

The league was formed as the Alliance Premier League in 1979, coming into force for the 1979–80 season. The league drew its clubs from the Northern Premier League and the Southern League.

It greatly improved the quality of football at this lower level, as well as improving the financial status of the top clubs. This was reflected in 1986–87, when the Football League began accepting direct promotion and relegation between the Conference and the bottom division of the Football League, which at that time was known as the Football League Fourth Division and is now EFL League Two. The first team to be promoted by this method was Scarborough, and the first team relegated was Lincoln City, who regained their Football League status a year later as Conference champions.

Since 2002–03, the league has been granted a second promotion place, with a play-off deciding who joins the champions in League Two. Previously, no promotion from the Conference would occur if the winners did not have adequate stadium facilities. As of the start of the 2002–03 season, if a club achieves the automatic promotion or the play-off places but does not have an adequate stadium, their place will be re-allocated to the next highest placed club that has the required facilities.

In 2004–05, the Conference increased its size by adding two lower divisions, the Conference North and Conference South respectively, with the original division being renamed Conference National. For the 2006–07 season, the Conference National expanded from 22 to 24 teams by promoting four teams while relegating two teams and introduced a "four up and four down" system between itself and the Conference North and Conference South.

Sponsorship
The league's first sponsor was Gola during the 1984–85 and 1985–86 seasons. When Gola's sponsorship ceased, carmaker Vauxhall Motors—then the British subsidiary of General Motors—took over and sponsored the league until the end of the 1997–98 season.

The 1998–99 Conference campaign began without sponsors for the Conference, but just before the end of the season a sponsorship was agreed with Nationwide Building Society. This lasted until the end of the 2006–07 season, after which Blue Square took over. This would also prompt the leagues being renamed, with the Conference National becoming the Blue Square Premier, the Conference North becoming Blue Square North and the Conference South becoming Blue Square South. In April 2010, Blue Square announced a further three-year sponsorship deal. From the start of the 2010–11 season the divisions were renamed, with the addition of the word "Bet" after "Blue Square".

In July 2013 the Conference agreed another sponsorship deal with online payment firm Skrill. This lasted for only one year and the following July the Conference announced a brand-new three-year deal with Vanarama, later extended by two more years. 

In 2015, the Football Conference was renamed the National League. The top division was also officially renamed the National League and the lower divisions renamed as National League North and National League South. In January 2019 the League signed a three-year deal with Motorama, Vanarama's sister company. It was extended to three more years in March 2021.

Media coverage
In August 2006 Setanta Sports signed a five-year deal with the Conference. Under the deal, Setanta Sports started showing live matches in the 2007–08 season, with 79 live matches each season. Included in the deal were the annual play-off matches as well as the Conference League Cup, a cup competition for the three Football Conference divisions. Setanta showed two live matches a week, with one on Thursday evening and one at the weekend.
In Australia the Conference National was broadcast by Setanta Sports Australia. Setanta Sports suffered financial problems and ceased broadcasting in the United Kingdom on 23 June 2009. Sky Sports broadcast the Conference play-off final 2010 at Wembley Stadium.

On 19 August 2010, Premier Sports announced that it bought the live and exclusive UK television rights to 30 matches per season from the Conference Premier for a total of three seasons. The 30 matches selected for broadcast included all five Conference Premier play-offs. The deal with the Football Conference was a revenue sharing arrangement whereby clubs received 50% of revenue from subscriptions, on top of the normal rights fee paid by the broadcaster, once the costs of production were met. The Conference also earned 50% from all internet revenue associated with the deal, which allowed them to retain advertising rights allied to those adverts shown with their matches. During the 2010–11 season, Premier Sports failed to attract enough viewers to its Conference football broadcasts to share any revenue with the clubs beyond the £5,000 broadcast fee paid to home clubs and £1,000 to away clubs.

In July 2013, BT Sport announced a two-year deal to broadcast 30 live games per season including all five play-off matches. In 2015 the National League announced that it renewed a three-year deal with BT Sport.

Current membership
The following 24 clubs compete in the National League during the 2022–23 season.

Past winners
Numbers in parentheses indicate wins up to that date.

No promotion to the Football League until 1987.
No promotion due to the club's stadium not being adequate for the Football League.
Boston United were allowed to retain their championship title and subsequent promotion to the Football League despite having been found guilty of serious financial misconduct during their title winning season. Following their later relegation at the end of the 2006–07 season, due to ongoing financial concerns and irregularities at the club, Boston were relegated a further division and placed in the Premier Division of the Northern Premier League.
Clubs voted to end the 2019–20 National League season using points per game after the season was suspended in March due to the COVID-19 pandemic.

Play-off results

Attendances
The highest average league attendance was in 2021–22 season, when 1.5 million fans attended National League matches, at an average of 3,084 per game. The lowest average league attendance came in the 2014–15 season, when 1 million spectators watched at an average of 1,853 per game. The highest seasonal average for a club was 8,647 for Wrexham in the 2021–22 season.

Records
 Most wins in a season: 31 – Aldershot Town (2007–08), Crawley Town, (2010–11), Fleetwood Town (2011–12)
 Most consecutive wins: 12 – Burton Albion (2008–09), Mansfield Town (2012–13)
Longest unbeaten run in a season: 30 – Crawley Town (2010–11)
 Fewest defeats in a season: 3 – Yeovil Town (2002–03), Crawley Town (2010–11)
 Most goals scored in a season: 103 – Barnet (1990–91), Hereford United (2003–04)
 Fewest goals conceded in a season: 24 – Kettering Town (1993–94) / Stevenage Borough (2009–10)
 Most points in a season: 105 – Crawley Town (2010–11)
 Fewest points in a season: 1 – Dover Athletic (2021–22)
 Largest points gap between champions and 2nd place: 19 – Luton Town (2013–14) (101 points) over Cambridge United (82 points)
 Smallest points gap between champions and 2nd place: 0 – Colchester United (1991-92) (94 points) over Wycombe Wanderers by +9 goal difference
 Highest goal difference: 67 – Luton Town (2013–14)
 Biggest win: 9–0 – Runcorn beat Enfield (3 March 1990), Sutton United beat Gateshead (22 September 1990), Hereford United beat Dagenham & Redbridge (27 February 2004), Rushden & Diamonds beat Weymouth (21 February 2009), Tranmere Rovers beat Solihull Moors (8 April 2017)
 Record attendance (play-offs): 47,029 Bristol Rovers vs Grimsby Town at Wembley Stadium (Play-off final, 17 May 2015)
 Record attendance (league game): 16,511 Notts County vs Yeovil Town at Meadow Lane (19 November 2022)

See also
National League North
National League South

References

External links

The National League official website

1979 establishments in England
1
5
Sports leagues established in 1979
Eng
Professional sports leagues in the United Kingdom